The East German balloon escape occurred on 16 September 1979, when eight people in two families escaped the Eastern Bloc country of East Germany by crossing the border to the Western Bloc's West Germany in a homemade hot air balloon at around 2:00 a.m. The escape plot was carried out over one and a half years, including a previously unsuccessful attempt, three different balloons, and various modifications. One failed crossing alerted the government to the plot, but the police were not able to identify the suspects before their flight to the West.

Background

The Eastern Bloc country of East Germany was separated from West Germany by the Inner German border and the Berlin Wall, which were heavily fortified with watchtowers, land mines, armed soldiers, and various other measures to prevent its citizens from escaping to the West. The East German border patrols were instructed by standing order to prevent border penetration by all means including lethal force (Schießbefehl; "order to fire").

Peter Strelzyk (1942–2017), an electrician and former East German Air Force mechanic, and Günter Wetzel (born 1955), a bricklayer by trade, were colleagues at a local plastics factory who had been friends for four years. They shared a desire to flee the country and began discussing ways to cross the border. On 7 March 1978, they agreed to work to plan an escape. They considered building a helicopter but quickly realized they would not be able to acquire an engine capable of powering such a craft. Next, they decided to investigate the idea of constructing a hot air balloon, having been inspired by a television program about ballooning. An alternate account is that they were given a magazine article about the International Balloon Festival in Albuquerque, New Mexico, by a relative.

Construction
The pair began research into balloons. Their plan was to escape with their wives and total of four children (aged 2 to 15).

The pair lived in Pößneck, a small town of about 20,000 where large quantities of cloth would not be available without raising attention. They tried neighbouring towns of Rudolstadt, Saalfeld, and Jena without success. They travelled  to Gera where they purchased  rolls of cotton cloth totalling  in length at a department store after telling the astonished clerk that they needed the large quantity of material to use as tent lining for their camping club.

Strelzyk spent the time building the gondola and burner assembly. The gondola was made from an iron frame, sheet metal floor, and clothesline run around the perimeter every  for the sides. The burner was made using two  bottles of liquid propane household gas, hoses, water pipe, a nozzle, and a piece of stove pipe.

First test
The team was ready to test the craft in April 1978. After lighting the burner one night, they failed to inflate the balloon. They thought the problem could be that they laid the balloon out on the ground. After weeks of additional searching, they found a  cliff at a rock quarry where they could suspend the balloon vertically before inflation but that was also unsuccessful.

Next they decided to fill the bag first with air at ambient temperature before using the burner to raise the air temperature to provide lift. They constructed a blower with a 14 hp  motorcycle engine, started with a Trabant automobile starter powered by jumper cables from Strelzyk's Moskvitch sedan. This engine, quieted by a Trabant muffler, turned  fan blades to inflate the balloon. They also used a home-made flamethrower, similar to the gondola's burner, to pre-heat the air faster. With these modifications in place, they returned to the secluded clearing to try again but could still not inflate the balloon. Using the blower did allow them to discover that the cotton material with which they fashioned the balloon was too porous and leaked massively.
 
Their unsuccessful effort cost them 2,400 DDM. Strelzyk disposed of the cloth by burning it in his furnace over several weeks.

Second test
The pair purchased samples of different fabrics in local stores, including umbrella material and various samples of taffeta and nylon. They used an oven to test the material for heat resistance and created a test rig from a vacuum cleaner and a water-filled glass tube to determine which material would allow the vacuum to exert the most suction on the water. This would reveal which material was most impervious to air. The umbrella covering performed the best but was also the most expensive. They instead selected a synthetic kind of taffeta.

To purchase a large quantity of fabric without arousing too much suspicion, they again drove to a distant city. Their cover story this time was that they were in a sailing club and needed the material to make sails. The quantity they needed had to be ordered, and although they feared the purchase might have been reported to East Germany's State Security Service (Stasi), they returned the next day and picked up the material without incident. On the way home, they also purchased an electric motor to speed up the pedal-operated sewing machine they had been using to sew the material into the desired balloon shape.

Wetzel spent the next week sewing the material into another balloon, accomplishing the task faster the second time with the now-electric sewing machine. Soon after, they returned to the forest clearing and had the bag inflated in about five minutes using the blower and flame thrower. The bag arose and held air, but the burner on the gondola was not powerful enough to create the heat needed for lift. They continued experimenting for months, doubling the number of propane tanks and trying different mixtures of fuels. Disappointed with the result, Wetzel decided to abandon the project and instead started to pursue the idea of building a small gasoline engine-powered light aeroplane or a glider.

Strelzyk continued trying to improve the burner. In June 1979, he discovered that with the propane tank inverted, additional pressure caused the liquid propane to gasify which would create a bigger flame. Strelzyk was ready to attempt an escape.

First escape attempt
On 3 July 1979, the weather and wind conditions were favourable. They reached an altitude of  according to an altimeter Strelzyk had made by modifying a barometer. A moderate wind was blowing them towards the border and freedom in West Germany. The balloon entered a cloud, atmospheric water vapour condensed on the balloon and the added weight of the water caused the balloon to descend. Unsure of where they were, Strelzyk explored until he found a piece of litter – a bread bag from a bakery in Wernigerode, an East German town. They made it home just in time to report absent due to sickness from work and school.

The balloon was left where it landed and discovered later that morning. Strelzyk destroyed everything remaining and sold his car fearing that could connect him to the balloon. On 14 August 1979, the Stasi advertised for help finding the "perpetrator of a serious offence" and listed in detail all the items left at the crash site. He felt that the Stasi would eventually trace the balloon to him and the Wetzels. Strelzyk conferred with Wetzel and they agreed their best chance was to quickly build another balloon and get out as soon as possible.

Successful escape

They needed  of taffeta, and purchased the material, in various colours and patterns, all over the country to escape suspicion. Confident in their calculations, they found weather conditions right on 15 September when a violent thunderstorm created the correct winds and set off for the launch site in Strelzyk's replacement car (a Wartburg) and a moped. Arriving at 1:30 am, they needed just ten minutes to inflate the balloon and an additional three minutes to heat the air.

They lifted off just after 2:00 am and, because the tethers holding the gondola to the ground had not been cut synchronously, it tilted sending the flame towards the fabric, which caught fire. A design miscalculation resulted in the burner stovepipe being too long, causing the flame to be too high in the balloon creating excessive pressure which caused the balloon to split. Air rushing out of the split extinguished the burner flame. Wetzel was able to re-light the flame with a match and had to do so several more times before they landed. They later learned they had been high enough to be detected, but not identified, on radar by West German air traffic controllers. They had also been detected on the East German side by a night watchman at the district culture house in Bad Lobenstein. The report of an unidentified flying object heading toward the border caused guards to activate search lights, but the balloon was too high and out of reach of the lights.

The tear in the balloon meant they had to use the burner much more often and the distance they could travel was greatly limited. Wetzel later said he thought they could have travelled another  had the balloon remained intact. They made out the border crossing at Rudolphstein on the A9 and saw the search lights. When the propane ran out they descended quickly, landing near the town of Naila, in the West German state of Bavaria and only  from the border. The only injury was suffered by Wetzel, who broke his leg upon landing. Various clues indicated to the families that the balloon had made it across the border. These included spotting red and yellow coloured lights, not common in East Germany, and small farms, in contrast to the large state-run operations in the east. Another clue was modern farm equipment, unlike the older equipment used in East Germany. Two Bavarian State Police officers saw the balloon's flickering light and headed to where they thought it would land. There they found Strelzyk and Wetzel, who first asked if they had made it to the west, although they noticed the police car was an Audi – another sign they were in West Germany. Upon learning they had, they happily called for their families to join them.

Aftermath
East Germany immediately increased border security, closed all small airports close to the border, and ordered the planes kept farther inland. Propane gas tanks became registered products and large quantities of fabric suitable for balloon construction could no longer be purchased. Mail from East Germany to the families was prohibited.

Erich Strelzyk learned of his brother's escape on the ZDF news and was arrested three hours after the landing in his Potsdam apartment. The arrest of family members was standard procedure to deter others from attempting escape. He was charged with "aiding and abetting escape" as were Strelzyk's sister Maria and her husband who were sentenced to  years. The three were eventually released with the help of Amnesty International.

The families decided to initially settle in Naila where they landed. Wetzel worked as an automobile mechanic and Strelzyk opened a TV repair shop in Bad Kissingen.  Owing to pressure on them from Stasi spies, the Strelzyks moved to Switzerland in 1985. After the German reunification in 1990, they returned to their hometown of Pößneck and to their old home there. The Wetzels remained in Bavaria.

The West German weekly magazine Stern paid Strelzyk and Wetzel for exclusive rights to the story.

The escape has been portrayed in two films: Night Crossing (1982) and Balloon (2018). The former, also called With the Wind to the West – the English translation of the German title, was an English-language film produced by Disney. The Strelzyks were reportedly "moved to tears" at the screening of the movie at Rockefeller Center in New York City. The latter was a German-language production which "both families welcomed [Director] Herbig’s desire to, as he put it, 'make a German film for an international audience.'" Herbig said in 2018 that both the Strelzyk and Wetzel families were dissatisfied with the Disney film.

Peter Strelzyk died in 2017 at age 74 after a long illness.

In 2017, the balloon was put on permanent exhibition at the Haus der Bayerischen Geschichte: Museum, Bavaria.

Escapees
The family members included:
Peter Strelzyk, age 37
Doris Strelzyk
Frank Strelzyk, age 15
Andreas Strelzyk, age 11
Günter Wetzel, 24
Petra Wetzel
Peter Wetzel, age 5
Andreas Wetzel, age 2

Media
 The Disney film Night Crossing (1982) is an adaptation of the story
 Michael Herbig's film Balloon (2018) is a German-language adaptation of the story
 BBC program Outlook, "Fleeing Communism in a Hot Air Balloon"
 PBS Nova program, "History's Great Escapes" (2004)
 Doris Strelzyk, Peter Strelzyk, Gudrun Giese: Destiny Balloon Escape. Quadriga, Berlin 1999, 
 Jürgen Petschull, With the Wind to the West. The Adventurous Flight from Germany to Germany. Goldmann, Munich 1980, 
 The Netflix series White Rabbit Project, episode 2, "Jailbreak"

See also

 Winfried Freudenberg
 Escape attempts and victims of the inner German border

References

External links
Escape by balloon by Günter Wetzel (participant website)
Video of balloon on museum display
BBC Outlook program
Photograph of Güenter Wetzel, Peter and Doris Strelzyk
Photograph of the actual balloon, inflated in 1985 at a festival in Hof, Bavaria

Balloons (aeronautics)
Cold War history of Germany
Escapes
1979 in East Germany
Inner German border
East German defectors